Paxia is a genus of plants in the family Connaraceae, first described in 1891. It is native to west-central Africa (Gabon and Nigeria).

Species

formerly included

Two illegitimate homonyms have been published using the same name, i.e.

1. Paxia Herter 1931, synonym of Ditaxis in Euphorbiaceae - endemic to South America
Paxia acaulis (Herter ex Arechav.) Herter, synonym of Ditaxis acaulis Herter ex Arechav - S Brazil, Uruguay, NE Argentina. Paraguay
Paxia rhizantha (Pax & K.Hoffm.) Herter, synonym of Ditaxis rhizantha Pax & K.Hoffm. - Uruguay
Paxia rosularis (Pax & K.Hoffm.) Herter, synonym of Ditaxis rosularis Pax & K.Hoffm. - Paraguay, NW Argentina
Paxia sellowiana (Pax & K.Hoffm.) Herter, synonym of Ditaxis sellowiana Pax & K.Hoffm. - S Brazil

2. Paxia Ö.Nilsson 1966, synonym of either Neopaxia or Claytonia (depending on source) in Montiaceae - endemic to Australia
Paxia australasica (Hook.f.) Ö.Nilsson, synonym of Neopaxia australasica (Hook.f.) Ö.Nilsson or Claytonia australasica Hook.f.

References

Connaraceae
Oxalidales genera